The Province of the Transvaal Official Gazette was the government gazette of Transvaal Province. It was published from 1910.

See also
List of British colonial gazettes
The Transvaal Government Gazette (1877-1881)

References

Transvaal
Publications established in 1910
Transvaal
Establishments in Transvaal